Christmas in the Clouds is a 2001 romantic comedy film about a ski resort owned and operated by a Native American tribe. Featured at the 2001 Sundance Film Festival, the film went on to receive Best Competition Feature Film at the Austin Film Festival and Best Native American-Theme Film at the Santa Fe Film Festival. The film was released in theaters and on DVD in 2005.

Cast
 Timothy Vahle as Ray Clouds on Fire
 Sam Vlahos as Joe Clouds on Fire
 Mariana Tosca as Tina Littlehawk
 M. Emmet Walsh as Stu O'Malley
 Graham Greene as Earl
 Sheila Tousey as Mary
 Rita Coolidge as Ramona
 Rosalind Ayres as Mabel
 Wes Studi as himself

Awards

See also
 List of Christmas films

References

External links
 
 
 New York Times Review

2001 films
2000s Christmas comedy films
American Christmas comedy films
Films about Native Americans
2001 comedy films
2000s English-language films
2000s American films